Tony Parun (born 24 August 1949) is a former professional tennis player from New Zealand.

Playing career
His brother, Onny Parun, was also a professional tennis player and they both represented New Zealand in the Davis Cup during the 1970s.

Parun qualified for the main draw of the 1973 Wimbledon Championships, where he lost to Mike Machette 6–3, 4–6, 3–6, 1–6.

Parun has two sons, Anthony and Bernhard, who both played tennis for Germany.

References

Living people
New Zealand male tennis players
1949 births